Jarno Laitinen (born 27 March 1988 in Pirkkala) is a Finnish ice hockey goaltender. He currently plays for JYP in the SM-liiga.

References

JYP Jyväskylä players
1988 births
Living people
People from Pirkkala
Finnish ice hockey goaltenders
Sportspeople from Pirkanmaa